Karl Stürmer (9 October 1882 – 1943) was an Austrian professional footballer and manager.

Career

Footballer
As a footballer, he grew up in Wiener Cricket; then he played as full-back for First Vienna FC and as midfielder for Wiener AC.

With Wiener AC won a Tagblatt Pokal in 1901. He even played two matches with Austria national team.

Coach
In 1918 Stürmer began a long career as manager in Austria and Italy.

He managed Reggiana and Prato in Divisione Nazionale and Torino, Alessandria, Lazio, Livorno and Juventus (as Virginio Rosetta assistant) in Serie A.

Death
He died in 1943, shot by the Germans in Faenza, Italy, during Nazi German occupation of the country in World War II.

References

1882 births
1943 deaths
Deaths by firearm in Italy
Association football fullbacks
Association football midfielders
Footballers from Vienna
Austrian footballers
Austria international footballers
Serie A managers
Austrian football managers
Austrian expatriate football managers
A.C. Reggiana 1919 managers
Torino F.C. managers
U.S. Alessandria Calcio 1912 managers
S.S. Lazio managers
U.S. Livorno 1915 managers
U.S. Cremonese managers
Hellas Verona F.C. managers
A.C. Cesena managers
Juventus F.C. non-playing staff
Expatriate football managers in Italy
Austrian expatriate sportspeople in Italy
Austrian civilians killed in World War II